A singular solution ys(x) of an ordinary differential equation is a solution that is singular or one for which the initial value problem (also called the Cauchy problem by some authors) fails to have a unique solution at some point on the solution. The set on which a solution is singular may be as small as a single point or as large as the full real line. Solutions which are singular in the sense that the initial value problem fails to have a unique solution need not be singular functions.

In some cases, the term singular solution is used to mean a solution at which there is a failure of uniqueness to the initial value problem at every point on the curve. A singular solution in this stronger sense is often given as tangent to every solution from a family of solutions. By tangent we mean that there is a point x where ys(x) = yc(x) and  y's(x) = y'c(x) where yc is a solution in a family of solutions parameterized by c. This means that the singular solution is the envelope of the family of solutions.

Usually, singular solutions appear in differential equations when there is a need to divide in a term that might be equal to zero. Therefore, when one is solving a differential equation and using division one must check what happens if the term is equal to zero, and whether it leads to a singular solution. The Picard–Lindelöf theorem, which gives sufficient conditions for unique solutions to exist, can be used to rule out the existence of singular solutions. Other theorems, such as the Peano existence theorem, give sufficient conditions for solutions to exist without necessarily being unique, which can allow for the existence of singular solutions.

A divergent solution
Consider the homogeneous linear ordinary differential equation

where primes denote derivatives with respect to x. The general solution to this equation is 

For a given , this solution is smooth except at  where the solution is divergent. Furthermore, for a given , this is the unique solution going through .

Failure of uniqueness
Consider the differential equation

A one-parameter family of solutions to this equation is given by

Another solution is given by

Since the equation being studied is a first-order equation, the initial conditions are the initial x and y values. By considering the two sets of solutions above, one can see that the solution fails to be unique when . (It can be shown that for  if a single branch of the square root is chosen, then there is a local solution which is unique using the Picard–Lindelöf theorem.) Thus, the solutions above are all singular solutions, in the sense that solution fails to be unique in a neighbourhood of one or more points. (Commonly, we say "uniqueness fails" at these points.) Thus, the solution  is a singular solution in the stronger sense that uniqueness fails at every value of x. However, it is not a singular function since it and all its derivatives are continuous.

In this example, the solution  is the envelope of the family of solutions . The solution  is tangent to every curve  at the point .

The failure of uniqueness can be used to construct more solutions. These can be found by taking two constant  and defining a solution  to be  when , to be  when , and to be  when .

Further example of failure of uniqueness
Failure of uniqueness can also be seen in the following example of a Clairaut's equation:

We write y' = p and then

Now, we shall take the differential according to x:

which by simple algebra yields

This condition is solved if 2p+x=0 or if p′=0.

If p'  = 0 it means that y' = p = c = constant, and the general solution of this new equation is:

where c is determined by the initial value.

If x + 2p = 0 then we get that p = −½x and substituting in the ODE gives

Now we shall check when these solutions are singular solutions. If two solutions intersect each other, that is, they both go through the same point (x,y), then there is a failure of uniqueness for a first-order ordinary differential equation. Thus, there will be a failure of uniqueness if a solution of the first form intersects the second solution.

The condition of intersection is : ys(x) = yc(x).  We solve

We can verify that the curves are tangent at this point y's(x) = y'c(x). We calculate the derivatives:

Hence,

is tangent to every member of the one-parameter family of solutions

of this Clairaut equation:

See also
 Chandrasekhar equation
 Chrystal's equation
 Caustic (mathematics)
 Envelope (mathematics)
 Initial value problem
 Picard–Lindelöf theorem

Bibliography
 

Differential equations